Mediacorp Channel 8's television series The Dream Job is a blockbuster drama series produced by Mediacorp Studios in 2016. In this series, a vast fortune and inheritance is at stake when a mysterious man offers three young candidates, who are eventually discovered to be his illegitimate children from the many affairs he had during his younger days, a dream job at his horticulture estate. Revenge and family politics are at play initially but the "siblings" overcome differences and band together when one of them gets falsely accused of committing murder.

The show began airing on Mediacorp Channel 8 on 28 June 2016 with 30 episodes.

Episodic Guide

See also
List of MediaCorp Channel 8 Chinese Drama Series (2010s)
The Dream Job

Lists of Singaporean television series episodes